José Manuel Brunet (born 2 May 1894) was an Argentine fencer. He competed in the individual sabre event at the 1936 Summer Olympics.

References

1894 births
Year of death missing
Argentine male fencers
Argentine sabre fencers
Olympic fencers of Argentina
Fencers at the 1936 Summer Olympics
Fencers from Buenos Aires